Edward Smyth may refer to:

Edward Smyth (sculptor) (1749–1812), Irish sculptor
Edward Selby Smyth (1819–1896), British general
Edward Smyth (bishop) (1665–1720), Bishop of Down and Connor

See also
Edward Smith (disambiguation)
Edward Smythe (disambiguation)